The Bends is the second studio album by the English rock band Radiohead, released on 13 March 1995 by Parlophone. Most tracks were produced by John Leckie, with extra production by Radiohead, Nigel Godrich and Jim Warren. The Bends combines guitar songs and ballads, with more restrained arrangements and cryptic lyrics than Radiohead's debut album, Pablo Honey (1993).  

Work on The Bends began at RAK Studios, London, in February 1994, and lasted around four months in total. Tensions were high, with pressure from Parlophone to match sales of Radiohead's debut single "Creep", and progress was slow. After an international tour in May and June, Radiohead resumed work at Abbey Road in London and the Manor in Oxfordshire. The Bends was mixed by Leckie and by Sean Slade and Paul Q. Kolderie, who had produced Pablo Honey. It was Radiohead's first collaboration with Godrich and the cover artist Stanley Donwood, who have worked with Radiohead on every album since.

Several singles were released, backed by music videos: "My Iron Lung", the double A-side "Planet Telex / High and Dry", "Fake Plastic Trees", "Just", and Radiohead's top-five UK entry "Street Spirit (Fade Out)". "The Bends" was also released as a single in Ireland. A live video, Live at the Astoria, was released on VHS. Radiohead toured extensively in support of The Bends, including US tours supporting R.E.M. and Alanis Morissette.

Though it reached number four on the UK Albums Chart, The Bends failed to build on the success of "Creep" outside the UK, reaching number 88 on the US Billboard 200. It has since been certified platinum in the US and quadruple platinum in the UK. It received greater acclaim than Pablo Honey, including a nomination for Best British Album at the Brit Awards 1996; it elevated Radiohead from one-hit-wonders to one of the most recognised British bands. It is frequently named one of the greatest albums of all time, and was included in Colin Larkin's All Time Top 1000 Albums 3rd Edition (2000) and all three editions of Rolling Stone's 500 Greatest Albums of All Time. The Bends is credited for influencing a generation of post-Britpop acts, such as Coldplay, Muse and Travis.

Background
Radiohead released their debut album, Pablo Honey, in 1993. By the time they began their first US tour early that year, their debut single "Creep" had become a hit. Tensions were high, as the band felt pressured by the success and mounting expectations. Following the tours, the singer, Thom Yorke, became ill and Radiohead cancelled an appearance at Reading Festival. He told NME, "Physically I'm completely fucked and mentally I've had enough." According to some reports, Radiohead's record company, EMI, gave them six months to "get sorted" or be dropped. EMI's A&R head Keith Wozencroft denied this, saying: "Experimental rock music was getting played and had commercial potential. People voice different paranoias, but for the label [Radiohead] were developing brilliantly from Pablo Honey."

After Radiohead finished recording Pablo Honey, Yorke played the co-producer Paul Q Kolderie a demo tape of new material with the working title The Benz. Kolderie was shocked to discover the songs were "all better than anything on Pablo Honey". The guitarist Ed O'Brien later said: "After all that touring on Pablo Honey ... the songs that Thom was writing were so much better. Over a period of a year and a half, suddenly, bang." Kolderie credited Radiohead's Pablo Honey tours for "turning them into a tight band".

For their next album, Radiohead selected the producer John Leckie, who had produced records by acts they admired, including Magazine. The drummer, Philip Selway, said Radiohead were reassured by how relaxed and open-minded Leckie was on their first meeting. EMI instructed Radiohead to deliver a followup to "Creep" for the American market; however, according to Leckie, Radiohead had disowned "Creep" and did not "think in terms of making hit singles".

Recording was postponed so Leckie could work on the album Carnival of Light, by another Oxford band, Ride. Radiohead used the extra time to rehearse in a disused barn on an Oxfordshire fruit farm in January 1994. Yorke said: "We had all of these songs and we really liked them, but we knew them almost too well ... so we had to sort of learn to like them again before we could record them, which is odd."

Recording

EMI gave Radiohead nine weeks to record the album, planning to release it in October 1994. Work began at RAK Studios in London in February 1994. Yorke would arrive at the studio early and work alone at the piano; according to Leckie, "New songs were pouring out of him." The band praised Leckie for demystifying the studio environment. The guitarist Jonny Greenwood said: "He didn't treat us like he had some kind of witchcraft that only he understands. There's no mystery to it, which is so refreshing." The sessions saw Radiohead's first collaboration with their future producer Nigel Godrich, who engineered the RAK sessions. When Leckie left the studio to attend a social engagement, Godrich and the band stayed to record B-sides. One song produced by Godrich, "Black Star", was included on the album.

While Pablo Honey was mostly written by Yorke, The Bends saw greater collaboration. Previously, all three guitarists had often played identical parts, creating a "dense, fuzzy wall"; their Bends roles were more divided, with Yorke generally playing rhythm, Greenwood lead and Ed O'Brien providing effects. "(Nice Dream)" began as a simple four-chord song by Yorke, but was expanded with extra parts by O'Brien and Greenwood. Much of "Just" was written by Greenwood, who, according to Yorke, "was trying to get as many chords as he could into a song". The band also created more restrained arrangements; in O'Brien's words, "We were very aware of something on The Bends that we weren't aware of on Pablo Honey… If it sounded really great with Thom playing acoustic with Phil and [bassist Colin Greenwood], what was the point in trying to add something more?" 

"Planet Telex" began with a drum loop taken from another song, the B-side "Killer Cars", and was written and recorded in a single evening at RAK. Not satisfied with the versions of "My Iron Lung" recorded at RAK, Radiohead used a live performance from the London Astoria for the album, with Yorke's vocals replaced and the audience removed. Radiohead made several efforts to record "Fake Plastic Trees"; O'Brien likened one version to the Guns N' Roses song "November Rain", saying it was "pompous and bombastic ... just the worst". Eventually, Leckie recorded Yorke playing "Fake Plastic Trees" alone, which the rest of the band used to build the final song. "High and Dry" preceded the Bends sessions; it was recorded in 1993 at Courtyard Studios by Radiohead's live sound engineer, Jim Warren. Yorke later said it was a "very bad" song that EMI had pressured him into releasing.

"The Bends", "(Nice Dream)" and "Just" were identified as potential singles and became the focus of the early sessions, which created tension. Leckie recalled: "We had to give those absolute attention, make them amazing, instant smash hits, number one in America. Everyone was pulling their hair out saying, 'It's not good enough!' We were trying too hard." Yorke in particular struggled with the pressure, and Radiohead's co-manager Chris Hufford considered quitting, citing Yorke's "mistrust of everybody". Jonny Greenwood spent days testing new guitar equipment, searching for a distinctive sound, before reverting to his Telecaster. Colin Greenwood described the period as "eight weeks of hell and torture". According to Yorke, "We had days of painful self-analysis, a total fucking meltdown for two fucking months." 

With the October deadline abandoned, recording paused in May and June while Radiohead toured Europe, Japan and Australasia. The tour gave Radiohead a new sense of purpose, and their relationships improved. Hufford encouraged them to make the album they wanted, instead of worrying about "product and units". Work resumed for two weeks in July at the Manor studio in Oxfordshire, where Radiohead completed songs including "Bones", "Sulk" and "The Bends". 

Recording ended in November 1994 at Abbey Road Studios in London. Selway said the album was recorded in about four months total. Leckie mixed some of The Bends at Abbey Road. With deadlines approaching, EMI grew concerned that he was taking too long. Without his knowledge, they sent tracks to Sean Slade and Paul Q. Kolderie, who had produced Pablo Honey, to mix instead. Leckie disliked their mixes, finding them "brash", but later said: "I went through a bit of trauma at the time, but maybe they chose the best thing." Only three of Leckie's mixes were used on the album.

Music

The Bends has been described as alternative rock, Britpop and indie rock. Like Pablo Honey, it features guitar-oriented rock songs, but its songs are "more spacey and odd", according to The Gazette's Bill Reed. The music is more eclectic than Pablo Honey; Colin Greenwood said the band wanted to distinguish themselves from Pablo Honey and that The Bends better represented their style. The album title, a term for decompression sickness, references Radiohead's rapid rise to fame with "Creep". Yorke said, "We just came up too fast."

According to Kolderie, "The Bends was neither an English album nor an American album. It's an album made in the void of touring and travelling. It really had that feeling of, 'We don't live anywhere and we don't belong anywhere.'" Reed described the album as "intriguingly disturbed" and "bipolar". He likened "The Bends" to the late music of the Beatles, described "My Iron Lung" as hard rock, and noted more subdued sounds on "Bullet Proof..I Wish I Was" and "High and Dry", showcasing Radiohead's "more plaintive and meditative side".

Rolling Stone described The Bends as a "mix of sonic guitar anthems and striking ballads", with lyrics evoking a "haunted landscape" of sickness, consumerism, jealousy and longing. Several songs evoke a "sense of a disintegrated or disconnected subject". The journalist Mac Randall described the lyrics as "a veritable compendium of disease, disgust and depression" that nonetheless become uplifting in the context of the "inviting" and "powerful" arrangements. "Fake Plastic Trees" was inspired by the commercial development of Canary Wharf and a performance by Jeff Buckley, who inspired Yorke to use falsetto. Yorke laments the effects of consumerism on modern relationships. Sasha Frere-Jones compared its melody to the "second theme of a Schubert string quartet". In "Just", Jonny and Colin Greenwood create substantial space by playing octatonic scales that extend over four octaves. The angular guitar riff was influenced by John McGeoch's playing on the 1978 Magazine song "Shot By Both Sides"; Jonny Greenwood said that it was "pretty much the same kind of idea".

"Sulk" was written as a response to the Hungerford massacre. It originally ended with the lyric "just shoot your gun"; Yorke omitted it after the suicide of the Nirvana frontman Kurt Cobain in 1994, as he did not want listeners to believe it was an allusion to Cobain. "Street Spirit (Fade Out)" was inspired by R.E.M. and the 1991 novel The Famished Road by Ben Okri; the lyrics detail an escape from an oppressive reality. The journalist Rob Sheffield described "Street Spirit", "Planet Telex" and "High and Dry" as a "big-band dystopian epic".

Artwork 
The Bends was the first Radiohead album with artwork by Stanley Donwood. Donwood met Yorke while they were students at the University of Exeter, and previously created artwork for the My Iron Lung EP; Donwood has created all of Radiohead's artwork since. For The Bends, Yorke and Donwood hired a cassette camera and filmed objects including road signs, packaging and street lights. They entered a hospital to film an iron lung, but, according to Donwood, found that iron lungs "are not very interesting to look at". Instead, they filmed a CPR mannequin, which Donwood described as having "a facial expression like that of an android discovering for the first time the sensations of ecstasy and agony, simultaneously". To create the cover image, the pair displayed the footage on a television set and photographed the screen.

Release 
The Bends was released in Japan on 8 March 1995 by EMI, and in the UK on 13 March by Parlophone Records. It spent 16 weeks on the UK Albums Chart, reaching number four. On the same day as the UK release, Radiohead's performance at the London Astoria in May 1994 was released on VHS as Live at the Astoria, including several Bends tracks.

In the US, The Bends was released on 4 April by EMI's North American subsidiary Capitol Records. According to the journalist Tim Footman, Capitol almost refused to release the album, feeling it lacked hit singles. The Bends debuted at the bottom of the US Billboard 200 in the week of 13 May before climbing to number 147 in the week of 24 June. It re-entered the chart in the week of 17 February 1996, and reached number 88 on 20 April, almost exactly a year after its release. On 4 April, it was certified gold by the RIAA for sales of half a million copies. Though The Bends remains Radiohead's lowest-charting album in the US, it was certified platinum in January 1999 for sales of one million copies.  

Interest from influential musicians such as the R.E.M. vocalist Michael Stipe, combined with several distinctive music videos, helped sustain Radiohead's popularity outside the UK. Selway credited the videos for helping The Bends "gradually seep into people's consciousness". "Fake Plastic Trees" was used in the 1995 film Clueless and is credited for introducing Radiohead to a larger American audience. According to the MTV host Matt Pinfield, record companies would ask why MTV kept promoting The Bends when it was selling less than their albums; his reply was: "Because it's great!" Yorke thanked Pinfield by giving him a gold record of The Bends.

By the end of 1996, The Bends had sold around 2 million copies worldwide. In the UK, it was certified platinum in February 1996 for sales of over 300,000. In July 2013, it was certified quadruple platinum.

Singles 
In September 1994, EMI released the My Iron Lung EP, comprising "My Iron Lung" plus Bends outtakes. "My Iron Lung" was also released as a single. The A&R VP Perry Watts-Russel said EMI did not pursue radio play as it was "only meant to be a fan-based item" rather than a "proper first single" for The Bends.

The first American single from The Bends, "Fake Plastic Trees", failed to enter the US Billboard Hot 100, but reached number 20 on the UK Singles Chart. "Just", released in the UK on August 21, reached number 19. It was not released as a single in the US, but its music video, directed by Jamie Thraves, received attention there. The next US single, "High and Dry", reached number 78. "Street Spirit (Fade Out)", released in January 1996, reached number five on the UK Singles Chart, surpassing "Creep" and demonstrating that Radiohead were not one-hit wonders. "The Bends" was released as a single in Ireland and reached number 26 on the Irish Singles Chart in August 1996.

Tours 
Radiohead toured extensively for The Bends, with performances in North America, Europe and Japan. They first toured in support of Soul Asylum, then R.E.M., one of their formative influences and one of the world's biggest rock bands at the time. The night before a 1995 performance in Denver, Colorado, Radiohead's tour van was stolen and with it their musical equipment. Yorke and Jonny Greenwood performed a stripped-down acoustic set with rented instruments and several shows were cancelled. In 2015, Greenwood was reunited with one of the stolen guitars after a fan recognised it as one they had purchased in Denver in the 1990s.  

Radiohead's American tour included a performance at the KROQ Almost Acoustic Christmas concert at the Universal Amphitheatre in Los Angeles, alongside Oasis, Alanis Morissette, No Doubt and Porno for Pyros. The Capitol employee Clark Staub described this as a "key stepping stone" for Radiohead in the US. In March 1996, Radiohead toured the US again and performed on The Tonight Show and 120 Minutes. In mid-1996, they played at European festivals including Pinkpop in Holland, Tourhout Werchter in Belgium and T in the Park in Scotland. In August, Radiohead toured as the opening act for Morissette.

Critical reception

The Bends received acclaim in the United Kingdom. The Guardian critic Caroline Sullivan wrote that Radiohead had "transformed themselves from nondescript guitar-beaters to potential arena-fillers ... The grandeur may eventually pall, as it has with U2, but it's been years since big bumptious rock sounded this emotional." Q described The Bends as a "powerful, bruised, majestically desperate record of frighteningly good songs", while NMEs Mark Sutherland wrote that "Radiohead clearly resolved to make an album so stunning it would make people forget their own name, never mind ['Creep']", describing it as "the consummate, all-encompassing, continent-straddling '90s rock record". Dave Morrison of Select wrote that it "captures and clarifies a much wider trawl of moods than Pablo Honey" and praised Radiohead as "one of the UK's big league, big-rock assets". NME and Melody Maker named The Bends among the top ten albums of the year.

Critical reception in the United States was mixed. Chuck Eddy of Spin deemed much of the album "nodded-out nonsense mumble, not enough concrete emotion", while Kevin McKeough from the Chicago Tribune panned Yorke's lyrics as "self-absorbed" and the music as overblown and pretentious. In The Village Voice, Robert Christgau wrote that the guitar parts and expressions of angst were skilful and natural, but lacked depth: "The words achieve precisely the same pitch of aesthetic necessity as the music, which is none at all." A positive review in the American press came from the Los Angeles Times Sandy Morris, who described Yorke as "almost as enticingly enigmatic as Smashing Pumpkins' Billy Corgan, though of a more delicate constitution".

Legacy
The Bends brought Radiohead significant critical attention. In 1997, Jonny Greenwood said it had been a "turning point" for Radiohead: "It started appearing in people's [best of] polls for the end of the year. That's when it started to feel like we made the right choice about being a band." In 2015, Selway said it marked the origin of the "Radiohead aesthetic", aided by Donwood's artwork. The success gave Radiohead the confidence to self-produce their next album, OK Computer (1997), with Godrich. 

The journalist Rob Sheffield recalled that The Bends "shocked the world", elevating Radiohead from "pasty British boys to a very 70s kind of UK art-rock godhead". Two years after its release, the Guardian critic Caroline Sullivan wrote that it had taken Radiohead from "indie one hit-wonder" into the "premier league of respected British rock bands"; the Rolling Stone journalist Jordan Runtagh wrote in 2012 that The Bends was a "a musically dense and emotionally complex masterwork that erased their one-hit-wonder status forever". The writer Nick Hornby wrote in 2000 that, with The Bends, Radiohead "found their voice ... No other contemporary band has managed to mix such a cocktail of rage, sarcasm, self-pity, exquisite tunefulness and braininess."

Influence 
The Bends influenced a generation of British and Irish acts, including Coldplay, Keane, James Blunt, Muse, Athlete, Elbow, Snow Patrol, Kodaline, Turin Brakes and Travis. Pitchfork credited songs as such as "High and Dry" and "Fake Plastic Trees" for anticipating the "airbrushed" post-Britpop of Coldplay and Travis. The Cure contacted Radiohead to inquire about the Bends production in the hope of replicating it; acts including Garbage, R.E.M. and k.d. lang began to cite Radiohead as a favourite band. 

In 2006, The Observer named The Bends one of "the 50 albums that changed music", saying it had popularised an "angst-laden falsetto ... a thoughtful opposite to the chest-beating lad-rock personified by Oasis", which "eventually coalesced into an entire decade of sound". Yorke held contempt for the style of rock The Bends popularised, feeling other acts had copied him. He said: "I was really, really upset about it, and I tried my absolute best not to be, but yeah, it was kind of like— that sort of thing of missing the point completely." Godrich felt Yorke was oversensitive and told him he did not invent "guys singing in falsetto with an acoustic guitar".

Accolades 
In 2000, in a vote of more than 200,000 music fans and journalists, The Bends was named the second-greatest album of all time behind Revolver (1966) by the Beatles. Q readers voted it the second-best album in 1998 and 2006, behind OK Computer. It was included in the 2005 book 1001 Albums You Must Hear Before You Die. Rolling Stone placed it at number 110 on its original 2003 list of the 500 Greatest Albums of All Time, at 111 in its 2012 list, and at 276 in its 2020 list. In 2006, it reached number 10 in a worldwide poll of the great albums organised by British Hit Singles & Albums and NME. Paste named it the 11th greatest album of the 1990s. In 2020, the Independent named it the best album of 1995, writing: "Downbeat, melancholic, yet wonderfully melodic and uplifting ... The Bends stood apart from Britpop and everything else in the storied year of 1995." In 2017, Pitchfork named The Bends the third-greatest Britpop album, writing that its "epic portrayal of drift and disenchantment secures its reluctant spot in Britpop's pantheon".

Reissues 
Radiohead left EMI after their contract ended in 2003. In 2007, EMI released Radiohead Box Set, a compilation of albums recorded while Radiohead were signed to EMI, including The Bends. On 31 August 2009, EMI reissued The Bends and other Radiohead albums in a "Collector's Edition" compiling B-sides and live performances. Radiohead had no input into the reissue and the music was not remastered. Radiohead had no input into the reissues and the music was not remastered.

In February 2013, Parlophone was bought by Warner Music Group (WMG). In April 2016, as a result of an agreement with the trade group Impala, WMG transferred Radiohead's back catalogue to XL Recordings. The EMI reissues, released without Radiohead's consent, were removed from streaming services. In May 2016, XL reissued Radiohead's back catalogue on vinyl, including The Bends.

Track listing

All songs written by Radiohead.

 "Planet Telex" – 4:19
 "The Bends" – 4:06
 "High and Dry" – 4:17
 "Fake Plastic Trees" – 4:50
 "Bones" – 3:09
 "(Nice Dream)" – 3:53
 "Just" – 3:54
 "My Iron Lung" – 4:36
 "Bullet Proof... I Wish I Was" – 3:28
 "Black Star" – 4:07
 "Sulk" – 3:42
 "Street Spirit (Fade Out)" – 4:12

Personnel
Adapted from the liner notes.

Radiohead
 Thom Yorke – lead vocals, guitars, piano; string arrangements
 Jonny Greenwood – guitar, organ, recorder, synthesiser, piano; string arrangements
 Ed O'Brien – guitar, backing vocals
 Colin Greenwood – bass
 Philip Selway – drums

Additional musicians
 Caroline Lavelle – cello
 John Matthias – viola, violin

Production
 John Leckie – production , mixing (tracks 2, 3, 11, 12), engineering
 Radiohead – production , mixing
 Nigel Godrich – production , engineering
 Jim Warren – production , engineering
 Sean Slade – mixing
 Paul Q. Kolderie – mixing
 Chris Brown – engineering
 Guy Massey – engineering assistance
 Shelley Saunders – engineering assistance
 Chris Blair – mastering

Design
 Stanley Donwood – artwork
 The White Chocolate Farm – artwork
 Green Ink – painting

Charts

Weekly charts

Year-end charts

Certifications

References

Bibliography

External links 

Album online on Spotify, a music streaming service

1995 albums
Radiohead albums
Parlophone albums
Capitol Records albums
Albums produced by John Leckie
Albums produced by Nigel Godrich
Albums recorded at RAK Studios
Alternative rock albums by British artists
Britpop albums
Indie rock albums by British artists